Gro-Anita Mykjåland (born 4 September 1976) is a Norwegian politician.

She was elected representative to the Storting from the constituency of Aust-Agder for the period 2021–2025, for the Centre Party.

She was mayor of Iveland from 2011 to 2021.

References

1976 births
Living people
Centre Party (Norway) politicians
Aust-Agder politicians
Mayors of places in Aust-Agder
Members of the Storting
Women members of the Storting